Kewadin Casino, Hotel and Convention Center is a casino, hotel, and convention center in  Sault Ste. Marie, Michigan which opened in November 1985. It is one of the Kewadin Casinos, which are all owned and operated by the Sault Tribe of Chippewa Indians.

History 
The Sault Tribe of Chippewa Indians Board of Directors approved the opening of a casino in 1984. The Kewadin Casino, Hotel and Convention Center opened in November 1985, originally as a one-room blackjack house.

The facility was expanded in 1988, 1992, 1993, 1994, 1997, and 2004.

In June 2011, an anonymous tip led to the arrest of two Oklahoma residents by the Sault Ste. Marie Tribal Police after being observed by casino security personnel of using a device to manipulating gaming machines into paying larger payouts. A subsequent investigation by the Sault Ste. Marie Tribal Police and Federal Bureau of Investigation revealed that six individuals had been working together and traveled to the casino on 52 weekends between June 2009 and June 2011 stealing approximately $310,000 from the casino. In October 2013, the six each pleaded guilty to a count of conspiracy to commit theft from a gaming establishment on Indian lands. They were each sentenced by U.S. District Judge Robert Holmes Bell on March 1, 2014.

Features 
Kewadin Casino, Hotel and Convention Center includes a casino gaming space, a 320-room hotel, and a  convention center. The facility also includes  of kitchen space and a  restaurant which serves over 400,000 people per year. The facility's Dreamcatchers restaurant includes keno gaming.

See also 

 List of casinos in Michigan

References

External links 
 

1985 establishments in Michigan
Buildings and structures in Sault Ste. Marie, Michigan
Casinos in Michigan
Casinos completed in 1985
Casino hotels
Native American casinos
Tourist attractions in Chippewa County, Michigan
Native American history of Michigan